The 1864 United States presidential election in Minnesota took place on November 8, 1864, as part of the 1864 United States presidential election. State voters chose four representatives, or electors, to the Electoral College, who voted for president and vice president.

Minnesota was won by the incumbent President Abraham Lincoln (R-Illinois), running with former Senator and Military Governor of Tennessee Andrew Johnson, with 59.06% of the popular vote, against the 4th Commanding General of the United States Army George B. McClellan (D–New Jersey), running with Representative George H. Pendleton, with 40.94% of the vote.

Results

Results by county

See also
 United States presidential elections in Minnesota

References

Minnesota
1864
1864 Minnesota elections